The A54 road is a road in England linking Chester in Cheshire with Buxton in Derbyshire. Its route through both urban and steep rural areas presents a challenge to Cheshire County Council in maintaining the safety of the road. Many years ago it was the main east–west route in Cheshire. The importance of the A54 through Middlewich and Winsford decreased in the 1970s and 1980s with the building of the M56 motorway and dualling of the A556 at Northwich. The section through Winsford carries approximately 30,000 vehicles per day.

History
Re-routing of the A54 away from the narrow cobbled streets of Congleton town centre was first proposed in 1935. Before this, at the point where the A34 now meets the A54 an unusual  lighthouse was erected in 1924 bearing the words "Dangerous hill – change to low gear", backlit at night, to reduce accidents at the sharp bend.

According to a 2007 report by the Road Safety Foundation for the European Road Assessment Programme (EuroRAP), the A54 is one of the most dangerous roads in the UK, second only to the A682 in Lancashire. Again in 2008 the road was rated as one of the highest-risk roads in Great Britain by EuroRAP, with a risk rating of Medium to High on its most dangerous stretch between Buxton and Congleton.  Eighteen fatal or serious-injury accidents occurred on this  stretch of single-carriageway road between 2003 and 2005, 26% of which were accidents at junctions.

Route

It continues on a single carriageway until it reaches Kelsall, where it becomes a 2-mile long dual carriageway on the Kelsall Bypass, which is dual carriageway because of the road's 13% incline into Delamere Forest. The westbound carriageway is subject to a mix of fixed and mobile speed cameras on its sharp descent into the Dee valley. It then becomes single carriageway again when the road reaches a TOTSO junction with the A556 to Manchester and Northwich.

The first town is Winsford, where the road is a dual carriageway for  through the town centre. This is the busiest section, with around 30,000 vehicles using it per day. Unusually, the suburbs have been bypassed while the main road runs directly along the High Street. Because of its urban environment and heavy traffic, it has a short section where it becomes a 3/4-lane dual carriageway in each direction between the Dene Drive and Collingham Way junctions. In Winsford it crosses the River Weaver via two bridges on a large roundabout. The traffic volume then reduces significantly when it meets the A5018 towards Northwich and the A533 North, which is used by vehicles going north to the M6 motorway and M56 to Manchester via the A556. It then continues on another bypass with a crawler lane going eastbound because of its  ascent, passing Winsford railway station and Winsford Industrial Estate before picking up its original Roman route on Middlewich Road.

It then continues into Cheshire East and Middlewich, where it again passes through the town centre, on the Wheelock Street bypass. At a roundabout with Centurion Way it merges with traffic that has continued on the A556 to Northwich and the A530 King Street instead of using the route through Winsford. It then becomes much busier, carrying much of the traffic to the M6 junction 18 from central Cheshire.

After passing through Middlewich the A54 crosses over the M6 motorway at a conventional roundabout interchange, continuing through Holmes Chapel to Congleton, where it has a short overlap with the A34.

The road becomes more rural in character as it climbs through the Peak District National Park. The rural nature and high accident record of the A54 from Congleton and Buxton means the road is subject to 50 mph average speed cameras.

List of settlements

The road passes through or immediately adjacent to many towns and villages on its length. Only those with their own Wikipedia article are included here, listed in the order they appear along the road travelling west–east.

Tarvin
Kelsall
Over
Winsford
Wharton
Middlewich
Sproston
Holmes Chapel
Brereton
Somerford
Congleton
Bosley
Buxton

See also
Cat and Fiddle Road

References

Roads in England
Roads in Cheshire
Roads in Derbyshire